Osmund (fl. ) was a King of Sussex, apparently reigning jointly with Oswald, Ælfwald, and Oslac.

According to the Anglo-Saxon Chronicle, version D, Osmund was reigning in Sussex when Archbishop Cuthbert died in 760, so his rule commenced before that event.

Osmund issued a charter, dated 762 in error for 765, as Osmundus.

Osmund also issued a charter dated 770 in which he is listed as Osmundus rex.

So Osmund’s reign was from in or before 760 to between 770 and 772, as he witnessed a charter of Offa, King of Mercia, dated 772 as Osmund dux. Evidently he was demoted from king to ealdorman following Offa's conquest of Sussex.

References

External links
 

770s deaths
South Saxon monarchs
8th-century English monarchs
Year of birth unknown